Stephania capitata also known as sumbat kendi or vase plug in Indonesian is a medicinal plant that was commonly used as a substitute of Cyclea barbata to produce green grass jelly.

References

Flora of Asia
capitata
Edible plants